Dhu'l-wizaratayn was an honorific title given to senior ministers in the Islamic world. It can refer to:

 Sa'id ibn Makhlad (died 889),  vizier of the Abbasid Caliphate
 Ghalib ibn Abd al-Rahman (c. 900 – 981), vizier of the Umayyad caliphate of Cordoba
 Abu'l-Qasim al-Husayn ibn Ali al-Maghribi (981–1027), vizier of the Fatimid Caliphate, held the augmented form al-kamil dhu'l-wizaratayn ('perfect possessor of the two vizierates')
Ibn Abi al-Khisal (1072–1146), vizier and secretary of the Almoravid dynasty
 Abu Abdallah ibn al-Hakim (1261–1309), vizier of the Emirate of Granada
 Ibn al-Jayyab (1274–1349), vizier of the Emirate of Granada
 Ibn al-Khatib (1313–1374), vizier of the Emirate of Granada

Arabic words and phrases